Position Ignition was a Careers Guidance Service that provided career support, advice and guidance to individuals and organizations. It was set up to provide highly personal career consulting services to individuals similar to those provided to senior businessmen in other professions such as a literary agent, talent agent and a sports agent. Although headquartered in London, United Kingdom, the company was a virtual business without any established offices.

History
The business was established in 2009, offering services around the career transition process. The company acted as a guidance service around areas including career planning, finding a job, getting promotions and choosing appropriate career directions. The career services provided all used a framework developed by co-founder Simon North, and run throughout the businesses main service streams.  In 2011, Position Ignition launched Position Ignition for Organisations, offering consulting and support to employers around working with and the management of employees.

Honours
In July 2010, the global media intelligence provider Cision placed Position Ignition's career blog at No. 9 in its Top 10 UK Career Development Blogs. Later on that month, Cision also featured the blog in its Featured Blog Spotlight. Also in July 2010, the career blog placed at No. 3 Online Degrees' 100 Career Advice Blogs.

Published Articles
Career articles written by Position Ignition co-founders Simon North and Nisa Chitakasem have appeared in The Guardian, Changing Careers Magazine, Director Magazine, ShortList and on iVillage.

Interviews with North have appeared on Simply Business Position Ignition has also featured or been cited on Total Jobs, Management Today, Moneywise, Student Accountant Magazine, The Press and Journal, and in The Sydney Morning Herald.

See also
 Career counseling
 Career development
 Job hunting
 Career Guide
 CareerBuilder
 Monster.com

References

Companies based in London
Career advice services
2009 establishments in England
Consulting firms established in 2009
Consulting firms of the United Kingdom